The presence of Nigerians in Italy dates back to the 1980s.

Numbers
In 2021, there are 119,435 immigrants from Nigeria in Italy. In 2014 in Italy there are 71,158 regular immigrants from Nigeria, while In 2006 there were 37,733. The three cities with most number of Nigerians are: Turin, Rome and Padua. But many Nigerians also reside on the island of Sicily.

Nigerians in Italy
 Destiny Udogie
 Eddy Wata (1974), singer
 Emeka Jude Ugali (1982), footballer
 Stephen Makinwa (1983), footballer
 Osarimen Giulio Ebagua (1986), footballer
 Angelo Ogbonna (1988), footballer 
 Victor Osimhen (1998), footballer
 Stefano Okaka (1989), footballer
 Joel Obi (1991), footballer
 Nicolao Dumitru (1991), footballer
 Paola Egonu (1998), volleyball player
 Adeleke Adebowale Julius (1985), Engineer

See also
 Senegalese people in Italy

References

Notes

African diaspora in Italy
Ethnic groups in Italy